In recursion theory, hyperarithmetic theory is a generalization of Turing computability.  It has close connections with definability in second-order arithmetic and with weak systems of set theory such as Kripke–Platek set theory.  It is an important tool in effective descriptive set theory.

The central focus of hyperarithmetic theory is the sets of natural numbers known as hyperarithmetic sets.  There are three equivalent ways of defining this class of sets; the study of the relationships between these different definitions is one motivation for the study of hyperarithmetical theory.

Hyperarithmetical sets and definability 

The first definition of the hyperarithmetic sets uses the analytical hierarchy. 
A set of natural numbers is classified at level  of this hierarchy if it is definable by a formula of second-order arithmetic with only existential set quantifiers and no other set quantifiers. A set is classified at level  of the analytical hierarchy if it is definable by a formula of second-order arithmetic with only universal set quantifiers and no other set quantifiers. The hyperarithmetical sets are exactly the  sets.

Hyperarithmetical sets and iterated Turing jumps: the hyperarithmetical hierarchy

The definition of hyperarithmetical sets as  does not directly depend on computability results.  A second, equivalent, definition shows that the hyperarithmetical sets can be defined using infinitely iterated Turing jumps.  This second definition also shows that the hyperarithmetical sets can be classified into a hierarchy extending the arithmetical hierarchy; the hyperarithmetical sets are exactly the sets that are assigned a rank in this hierarchy.

Each level of the hyperarithmetical hierarchy is indexed by a countable ordinal number (ordinal), but not all countable ordinals correspond to a level of the hierarchy. The ordinals used by the hierarchy are those with an ordinal notation, which is a concrete, effective description of the ordinal.

An ordinal notation is an effective description of a countable ordinal by a natural number. A system of ordinal notations is required in order to define the hyperarithmetic hierarchy. The fundamental property an ordinal notation must have is that it describes the ordinal in terms of smaller ordinals in an effective way. The following inductive definition is typical; it uses a pairing function .
 The number 0 is a notation for the ordinal 0.
 If n is a notation for an ordinal λ then  is a notation for λ + 1;
 Suppose that δ is a limit ordinal. A notation for δ is a number of the form , where e is the index of a total computable function  such that for each n,  is a notation for an ordinal λn less than δ and δ is the sup of the set .

This may also be defined by taking effective joins at all levels instead of only notations for limit ordinals.

There are only countably many ordinal notations, since each notation is a natural number; thus there is a countable ordinal which is the supremum of all ordinals that have a notation. This ordinal is known as the Church-Kleene ordinal and is denoted .  Note that this ordinal is still countable, the symbol being only an analogy with the first uncountable ordinal, .  The set of all natural numbers that are ordinal notations is denoted  and called Kleene's .

Ordinal notations are used to define iterated Turing jumps. Suppose that δ has notation e. These sets were first defined by Davis (1950) and Mostowski (1951). The set  is defined using e as follows.
 If δ = 0 then  is the empty set. 
 If δ is a limit ordinal, let  be the sequence of ordinals less than δ given by the notation e. The set  is given by the rule . This is the effective join of the sets .
Although the construction of  depends on having a fixed notation for δ, and each infinite ordinal has many notations, a theorem of Spector shows that the Turing degree of  depends only on δ, not on the particular notation used, and thus  is well defined up to Turing degree.

The hyperarithmetical hierarchy is defined from these iterated Turing jumps. There will always be a least such δ if there is any; it is this least δ that measures the level of uncomputability of X.

Hyperarithmetical sets and recursion in higher types 

A third characterization of the hyperarithmetical sets, due to Kleene, uses higher-type computable functionals. The type-2 functional  is defined by the following rules:
 if there is an i such that f(i) > 0,
 if there is no i such that f(i) > 0.

Example: the truth set of arithmetic 

Every arithmetical set is hyperarithmetical, but there are many other hyperarithmetical sets. One example of a hyperarithmetical, nonarithmetical set is the set T of Gödel numbers of formulas of Peano arithmetic that are true in the standard natural numbers . The set T is Turing equivalent to the set , and so is not high in the hyperarithmetical hierarchy, although it is not arithmetically definable by Tarski's indefinability theorem.

Fundamental results 

The fundamental results of hyperarithmetic theory show that the three definitions above define the same collection of sets of natural numbers. These equivalences are due to Kleene.

Completeness results are also fundamental to the theory. A set of natural numbers is  complete if it is at level  of the analytical hierarchy and every  set of natural numbers is many-one reducible to it. The definition of a  complete subset of Baire space is similar.   Several sets associated with hyperarithmetic theory are  complete:
 Kleene's , the set of natural numbers that are notations for ordinal numbers
 The set of natural numbers e such that the computable function  computes the characteristic function of a well ordering of the natural numbers. These are the indices of recursive ordinals.
 The set of elements of Baire space that are the characteristic functions of a well ordering of the natural numbers (using an effective isomorphism .

Results known as  bounding follow from these completeness results.

Relativized hyperarithmeticity and hyperdegrees 

The definition of  can be relativized to a set X of natural numbers: in the definition of an ordinal notation, the clause for limit ordinals is changed so that the computable enumeration of a sequence of ordinal notations is allowed to use X as an oracle. The set of numbers that are ordinal notations relative to X is denoted .

The definition of  can also be relativized to an arbitrary set  of natural numbers. The only change in the definition is that  is defined to be X rather than the empty set, so that  is the Turing jump of X, and so on.

The relativized hyperarithmetical hierarchy is used to define hyperarithmetical reducibility. If  and  then the notation  is used to indicate X and Y are hyperarithmetically equivalent. This is a coarser equivalence relation than Turing equivalence; for example, every set of natural numbers is hyperarithmetically equivalent to its Turing jump but not Turing equivalent to its Turing jump. The equivalence classes of hyperarithmetical equivalence are known as hyperdegrees.

Many properties of the hyperjump and hyperdegrees have been established. In particular, it is known that Post's problem for hyperdegrees has a positive answer: for every set X  of natural numbers there is a set Y of natural numbers such that .

Generalizations 

Hyperarithmetical theory is generalized by α-recursion theory, which is the study of definable subsets of admissible ordinals.

Relation to other hierarchies

References 
 H. Rogers, Jr., 1967. The Theory of Recursive Functions and Effective Computability, second edition 1987, MIT Press.  (paperback), 
 G. Sacks, 1990.  Higher Recursion Theory, Springer-Verlag. 
 S. Simpson, 1999. Subsystems of Second Order Arithmetic, Springer-Verlag.
 C. J. Ash, J. F. Knight, 2000. Computable Structures and the Hyperarithmetical Hierarchy, Elsevier.

Citations

External links 
 Descriptive set theory. Notes by David Marker, University of Illinois at Chicago. 2002. 
 Mathematical Logic II. Notes by Dag Normann, The University of Oslo. 2005.
Antonio Montalbán: University of California, Berkeley and YouTube content creator

Computability theory
Hierarchy